Diego Alfredo Molero Bellavia is a Venezuelan public official who served as Venezuela's Minister of Defense.

Ambassador 
On July 5, 2013, President Nicolas Maduro named him as Venezuela's Ambassador to Brazil but was appointed as Venezuela's Ambassador to Peru in October 2014.

He was expelled on August 11, 2017 by the government of Peru following congressional recommendation. Through a statement, the Ministry of Foreign Affairs said that its decision responds to "the breakdown of democratic order in Venezuela." The authorities gave Molero Bellavia five days to leave the country.

The political situation in Venezuela has generated a diplomatic confrontation between the governments in recent months, which has worsened after the establishment of the National Constituent Assembly in August 2017.

Sanctions 

Diego Alfredo Molero Bellavia is banned from entering Colombia. The Colombian government maintains a list of people banned from entering Colombia or subject to expulsion; as of January 2019, the list had 200 people with a "close relationship and support for the Nicolás Maduro regime".

References

Living people
Venezuelan politicians
Ambassadors of Venezuela to Brazil
Year of birth missing (living people)
People of the Crisis in Venezuela